Mr. Texas may refer to:

 Hernandez (wrestler) (born 1973), American professional wrestler, also known as Mr. Texas
 Mr. Texas (film), a 1951 American western film